Musicians from Finland are active in folk music, classical and contemporary art music, and contemporary popular music.

The folk music of Finland is typically influenced by Karelian traditional tunes and lyrics of the Kalevala metre. In the west of the country, more mainstream Nordic folk music traditions prevail. The Sami people of northern Finland have their own musical traditions, collectively Sami music. Finnish folk music has undergone a roots revival in the recent decades, and has also become a part of popular music.

In the field of classical and contemporary art music, Finland has produced many musicians and composers.

Contemporary popular music includes a renowned heavy metal scene like other Nordic countries, as well as a number of prominent rock and pop bands, jazz musicians, hip hop performers and makers of dance music.

Individuals

Bands and groups

See also
 List of bands from Finland
 List of Finnish singers
 List of Finnish jazz musicians
 List of Finnish operatic sopranos

 
 
Finnish